La Varenne–Chennevières is a French railway station in Saint-Maur-des-Fossés, in Val-de-Marne département.

The station 
The RER station was designed by Marcel Lods and opened in 1969. It is named after the former commune La Varenne, now part of Saint-Maur-des-Fossés, and the close commune Chennevières-sur-Marne.

It is served by RER line A trains running on A2 branch, leading to Boissy-Saint-Léger.

La Varenne–Chennevières is also a depot for trains. It houses premises for RATP officers training.

Service 
The station is served in both directions by a train every 10 minutes at off-peak time, by 12 trains an hour during peak hours, and by a train every 15 minutes at evening. It is also a terminus station for some trains at peak hours.

Bus connections 
The station is served by several buses:
 Situs Bus network line: 8.

Gallery

See also 
 List of stations of the Paris RER

References

Railway stations in France opened in 1969
Railway stations in Val-de-Marne
Réseau Express Régional stations